The 1948–49 season was Colchester United's seventh season in their history and their seventh in the Southern League. Alongside competing in the Southern League, the club also participated in the FA Cup and Southern League Cup. The club finished as runners–up in the Southern League Cup to Yeovil Town just ten days after losing the delayed 1947–48 season final to Merthyr Tydfil. The club exited the FA Cup in the first round to Reading, although the first encounter between the clubs was abandoned due to heavy fog. The match gathered a record Layer Road and Colchester United crowd of 19,072, before being abandoned with the scores at 1–1.

Season overview
Former Aston Villa and Portsmouth defender Jimmy Allen was tasked with taking Colchester United into the Football League when he stepped into the void left following Ted Fenton's departure for West Ham United during the simmer.

The ex-England international oversaw his side reach the final of the Southern League Cup for the second successive season. With the 1947–48 final held over from the previous season, Colchester first lost that final against Merthyr Tydfil 5–0, before losing the 1948–49 season final 3–0 to Yeovil Town ten days later. During these ten days, the club also played four league fixtures.

On the back of a successful FA Cup run across the 1947–48 season, much was expected of Colchester for their 1948–49 campaign. They drew Reading at home for their first–round fixture, but the game which drew a record Layer Road and Colchester United crowd of 19,072 was abandoned with the scores tied at 1–1 due to heavy fog. The rearranged match saw the U's crash out with a 4–2 defeat.

In the Southern League, Colchester once again finished in fourth position while Chelmsford City and Gillingham battled for the title, with the Kent side winning their second title in three years.

Players

Transfers

In

 Total spending:  ~ £1,000

Out

Match details

Southern League

League table

Matches

Southern League Cup

1947–48 season fixture

1948–49 season fixtures

FA Cup

Squad statistics

Appearances and goals

|-
!colspan="14"|Players who appeared for Colchester who left during the season

|}

Goalscorers

Clean sheets
Number of games goalkeepers kept a clean sheet.

Player debuts
Players making their first-team Colchester United debut in a fully competitive match.

See also
List of Colchester United F.C. seasons

References

General

Specific

1948-49
English football clubs 1948–49 season